Adler is a resort on the Black Sea coast located in the mouth of the Mzymta River. It used to be a town but is now a microdistrict within Adlersky City District of Sochi, Krasnodar Krai, Russia. It hosts a major railway station on the North Caucasus railway, which became the terminus after the Georgian–Abkhazian conflict broke the railway.

History
Svyatoy Dukh fortress was founded here by Russians in 1837. However, the region was inhabited long before the Russian arrival. Since ancient times, a Sadz Abkhazian village, named Liesh, had been located there. In the 12th century, the Genoese founded a factory here, known as Layso. During that time this land belonged to the Sadz princes of Aredba, which had one of their main settlements there. Turks called this place Artlar or Artı. Russians mispronounced it as Adler (from German , meaning "eagle"). However, another theory postulates that the name comes from the brig Adler.

Topography
Adler is one of the most popular Russian resorts. It has a pebbly and narrow beach, backed by the railway in some places.

There are Russian Orthodox churches of the Trinity and the Holy Spirit, as well as the Armenian Saint Sarkis Cathedral.

There are also the Adlersky District History Museum and the South Cultures park in Adler.

External links

Adlersky City District
Seaside resorts in Russia
Armenian diaspora communities
Armenian diaspora in Russia
Georgia (country)–Russia border crossings
Genoese colonies